Flight (released 1988 in Oslo, Norway, by Hot Club Records - HCR 25) is a studioalbum (LP) by the Norwegian guitarist Thorgeir Stubø, including two live recordings.

Review 
This is the fourth album by Thorgeir Stubø, released in 1985, and is a mixture of studio and live recordings from a concert in Tromsø, and consists of a variety of lineups. The record is perhaps the Stubø album that has the greatest diversification of styles. In addition to the traditional hard bop format, presented through songs like "Swinging till the girls come home" (Oscar Pettiford), "Nica's Dream" (Horace Silver), Stubø presents more modern, Pat Martino oriented influence through his own, more modal-based compositions, "Flight" and "For Wes and Pat". On Wayne Shorter's classic "Fall", there is also used synthesizer, and electric piano is also represented on a track. Fred Lacey's gorgeous ballad "Theme for Ernie" as made famous by Coltrane, also interpreted the great trio with acoustic guitars, like "Chelsea Bridge" (Strayhorn) and "Autumn in New York" (Duke).

Track listing
A side
"Flight" (9:50)(Thorgeir Stubø)
"Fall" (4:34) (Wayne Shorter)
"Swingin' Till The Girls Come Home" (9:38) (Oscar Peterson)
"Autumn In New York» (2:25) (Vernon Duke)

B side
"For Wes & Pat" (6:58)(Thorgeir Stubø)
"Theme For Ernie" (6:42) (Fred Lacey)
"Nica's Dream" (7:52) (Horace Silver)
"Chelsea Bridge" (4:52) (Billy Strayhorn)

Personnel
Thorgeir Stubø - acoustic guitar & electric guitar
Ivar Antonsen - piano (tracks: A1-A2, B1 & B4)
Lars Sjösten - piano (tracks: A3 & B3)
Krister Andersson - tenor saxophone
Jesper Lundgaard - double bass (tracks: A1 & B1-B2)
Terje Venaas - double bass (tracks: A3 & B3)
Alex Riel - drums & percussions (tracks: A1 & B1-B2)
Egil "Bop" Johansen - drums (tracks: A3 & B3)

Credits
Producer – Thorgeir Stubø
Engineer – Arve Hoel (tracks: A3, B3)
Executive Producer – Jon Larsen
Liner notes – Mike Hennessey
Photography by Ole J. Andreassen
Produced & engined by Jan Erik Kongshaug

Notes 
Recorded June 9 and 10, 1985, in Rainbow Studios, Oslo. "Swingin' Till The Girls Come Home" and "Nica's Dream" recorded live December 16, 1983, at Prelaten, Tromsø.

References

Thorgeir Stubø albums
1985 albums